Historical sociology is an interdisciplinary field of research that combines sociological and historical methods to understand the past, how societies have developed over time, and the impact this has on the present. It emphasises a mutual line of inquiry of the past and present to understand how discrete historical events fit into wider societal progress and ongoing dilemmas through complementary comparative analysis.

Looking at how social structures are changed and reproduced, historical sociology strives to understand the visible mechanisms and hidden structures that hinder certain parts of human development, whilst allowing other parts to thrive. Throughout this, it challenges the ahistoricism of modern sociology as a discipline, of the limited engagement with the past in studying social structures, whilst simultaneously critiquing the disengagement of historical study with the differences between societies and the broader social patterns between historical events.

This interdisciplinary field operates within a spectrum between history and sociology with a 'sociology of history' residing at one end and a 'history of society' residing at another. A diverse range of people can be found throughout this spectrum that explore history through a sociological lens compared to others that dissect society through its historical events. Although valid lines of research, they are based on singular disciplinary approaches and are reductionist in nature. In the middle of this spectrum historical sociology can be found that works to intertwine these mono-discipline efforts into an interdisciplinary approach.

Origins
As time has passed, history and sociology have developed into two different specific academic disciplines. Historical data was used and is used today in mainly these three ways.  The first one is: Examining a theory through a Parallel investigation. To correspond with the natural-science conceptions of laws, and to look at, or apply various historical material where you gather your resources in order to prove the theory that is applied. Or on the other hand sociologists for the parallel investigation theory could apply the theory to certain cases of investigation but in a different modalities of a more widely used process. The second theory that sociologists mainly use: applying and contrasting certain events or policies. Analysed by their specific, or what makes them in unique quality of a composition, certain events used by the sociologist for comparative data can be contrasted and compared. For interpretive sociologists it is very common for them to use the 'Verstehen' tradition. And lastly, the third way sociologists typically relate is by taking a look at the causalities from a macro point of view. This is Mill's method: " a) principle of difference: a case with effect and cause present is contrasted with a case with effect and cause absent; and b) principle of agreement: cases with same effects are compared in terms of their (ideally identical) causes. There is an important debate on the usefulness of Mill's method for sociological research, which relates to the fact that historical research is often based on only few cases and that many sociological theories are probabilistic, not deterministic. Today, historical sociology is measured by a conjunction of questions that are rich in detail.

Scope

Human agency 
A shared theme of sociology and history is accounting for the paradox of human agency. "The problem of agency is the problem of finding a way to account for human experience which recognises simultaneously and in equal measure that history and society are made by constant and more or less purposeful individual action and that individual action, however purposeful, is made by history and society".

This theme is presented across authors from Marx to Spencer where a symbiotic relation enables action to create structure, whilst that structure defines action. Here, historical sociology outlines that the key to understanding our human agency is to track its development over time. Better enabling us to see the changes and continuations of actions and structures that shape human agency throughout our societies.

Comparative historical sociology 
Contemporary historical sociology is primarily concerned with how the state has developed since the Middle Ages, analysing relations between states, classes, economic and political systems.

Impact on other disciplines

International relations  
(See International Relations)

Historical sociology has become an increasingly used approach in international relations to draw upon the reflective usefulness of historical sociology in exploring the past and present together, challenging unhistorical viewpoints in the field that stem from realist and neoliberalism paradigms that often see the wider structural makeup of the world as static.

Political economy 
(See Political Economy)

The work of political economy aims to reconcile the development of political and economic systems for insight into policy. Historical sociology critiques political economy for (1) viewing the present as a natural structure, (2) focus on history as a path dependent outcome, and (3) shaping their insights around prominent figures with limited engagement of wider processes and "regular" people.

Notable authors 

 Giovanni Arrighi
 Jean Baechler
 Randall Collins
 Emile Durkheim
 Norbert Elias
 Michel Foucault 
 John A. Hall
 Michael Mann
 Karl Marx
 Barrington Moore
 Karl Polanyi
 Stein Rokkan
 Theda Skocpol
 Charles Tilly 
 Immanuel Wallerstein
 Max Weber
 Reinhard Bendix
 Richard Lachmann
 Sinisa Malesevic
 Margaret Somers
 Julia Adams
 George Steinmetz

Journals 
Journal of Historical Sociology

Research organisations

Historical sociology 
American Sociological Association Comparative-Historical Sociology

British Sociological Association Historical & Comparative Sociology Study Group

International Sociological Association Historical Sociology Research Committee

Interdisciplinary 
Harvard University Political and Historical Sociology Research Cluster

See also

Comparative historical research
Comparative sociology
Critical juncture theory
History of sociology
International relations theory
Sociocultural evolution
World-systems theory
Economic sociology
Cliodynamics
Historical materialism
Imprinting

References

Further reading

Robert Leroux, History and Sociology in France: From Scientific History to the Durkheimian School, London, Routledge, 2018.
Charles Tilly, Historical Sociology, in Scott G. McNall & Gary N. Howe, eds., Current Perspectives in Social Theory. Vol. I. (1980) Greenwich, Connecticut: JAI Press, online
Charles Tilly, Historical Sociology, in International Encyclopedia of the Behavioral and Social Sciences (2001) Amsterdam: Elsevier. Vol. 10, 6753–6757, online
Charles Tilly, Three Visions of History and Theory, in History and Theory (2007) 46: 299-307, online
Charles Tilly, History of and in Sociology, introduction to the didactic seminar on methodologies of the history of sociology, American Sociological Association annual meeting, Montréal, May 2007, online
George Steinmetz, 'Ideas in Exile: Refugees from Nazi Germany and the Failure to Transplant Historical Sociology into the United States.” International Journal of Politics, Culture, and Society''', 2010.
George Steinmetz, 'The Historical Sociology of Historical Sociology: Germany and the United States in the 20th century', Sociologica (Italian Journal of Sociology online)2008 February). online
George Steinmetz,'The Relations between Sociology and History in the United States: The Current State of Affairs', Journal of Historical Sociology 20:1-2 (2007): 1-12.
John Baylis, Steve Smith, Globalization of world politics: An introduction to international relations'', Oxford University Press, 3rd ed., 2005, p. 276–278
David Baronov, The Dialectics of Inquiry Across the Historical Social Sciences. Routledge Press. 2013.

Reading list

Introductory 

 Delanty, G and Isin, E. F. (2003). Handbook of historical sociology. London: SAGE.

External links 
Scientific Prediction in Historical Sociology: Ibn Khaldun meets Al Saud

Interdisciplinary subfields of sociology
Historical sociology
Social history